{{Infobox school
 | name                    = The Edinburgh Academy
 | image                   = Edinburgh Academy frontage.jpg
 | image_size              = 300px
 | caption                 =
 | motto                   = Αἰὲν ἀριστεύειν (Always Excel)
 | established             = 
 | closed                  =
 | type                    = Public schoolPrivate school
 | religion                =
 | president               =
 | head_label              = Rector
 | head                    = Barry Welsh
 | r_head_label            =
 | r_head                  =
 | chair_label             =
 | chair                   =
 | founders                = Henry Cockburn, Leonard Horner and John Russell
 | specialist              =
 | address                 = Henderson Row
 | city                    = Edinburgh
 | county                  =
 | country                 = Scotland
 | postcode                = EH3 5BL
 | local_authority         =     City of Edinburgh
 | dfeno                   =
 | urn                     =
 | ofsted                  =
 | staff                   =
 | enrolment               = 93 (Nursery)372 (Junior School)552 (Senior School)
 | gender                  = Mixed
 | lower_age               = 2
 | upper_age               = 18
 | houses                  = CarmichaelCockburnHouses (Dundas)Kinross
 | colours                 = Blue and White 
 | publication             =
 | free_label_1            = HMIE Reports
 | free_1                  = Report
 | free_label_2            = School Song
 | free_2                  = Floreat Academia (May the Academy flourish)
 | free_label_3            = Former Pupils
 | free_3                  = Edinburgh Academicals / Accies
 | website                 = 
}}

The Edinburgh Academy is a private day school in Edinburgh, Scotland, which was opened in 1824. The original building, on Henderson Row in the city's New Town, is now part of the Senior School. The Junior School is located on Arboretum Road to the north of the city's Royal Botanic Garden.

The Edinburgh Academy was originally a day and boarding school for boys. It ceased boarding and transitioned to co-education in 2008 and is now a fully coeducational day school. The nursery, housed in a 2008 purpose built block on the Junior campus, caters for children from age 2 to 5. The Junior School admits children from age 6 to 10 whilst the Senior School takes pupils from age 10 to 18.

Foundation
In 1822, the school's founders, Henry Cockburn and Leonard Horner, agreed that Edinburgh required a new school to promote classical learning. Edinburgh's Royal High School provided a classical education, but the founders felt that greater provision was needed for the teaching of Greek, to compete with some of England's public schools. Cockburn and Horner recruited John Russell as a co-founder and the three of them, together with other interested parties, put a proposal to the City Council for the building of a new school. The City Fathers gave their approval in 1823 and fifteen Directors were elected, comprising the three founders along with Sir Walter Scott, Sir John Hay, Robert Dundas and nine others.

Buildings

The main building of the Senior School, with its Greek Doric frontage, was designed by architect William Burn. The stone used was principally from the nearby Craigleith Quarry. The Foundation Stone was laid in June 1823 and the school opened for the first session in October 1824. In 1892, new classrooms were built along the western wall of the site, and in 1900, the School Library was opened, followed by the new Science Block in 1909, both along the eastern wall. At the back of the school the Dining Hall, and the Rifle Range beneath it, was opened in 1912 and after World War I, the Gymnasium was built. This was dedicated as a War Memorial to Edinburgh Academicals (former pupils) who had fallen during the hostilities of 1914 to 1918. The memorial was by Pilkington Jackson. A later plaque commemorates ex-pupils who fell in the Second World War.

In 1945, a new building, Denham Green House, was acquired in the Trinity area of Edinburgh. This was used for the junior department (now known as Early Years) of the Preparatory School (now known as The Edinburgh Academy Junior School). In 1960, a new building for the upper three years of the Preparatory School was completed in Inverleith (Arboretum campus). Denham Green's nursery and early years facilities were relocated to purpose built accommodation on the Preparatory school's Arboretum campus in 1987. In 1992, the Rector's residence, Academy House and in 1997, a new Games Hall were constructed on the same campus. The latter was partly funded by money from The Lottery and Sports Council and is for the use not only of pupils in both parts of the school but also of the community in the area. A new computing and music building was completed at the Junior School in 2005 and a new nursery and after school facility in 2008.

At Henderson Row, the property next to the school, No 32, was acquired for administrative use in 1972 and in 1977, the Academy acquired the junior school of Donaldson's College, to the west. This allowed departments to expand and a purpose-built Music School was opened on this part of the campus in 1991. In 2005 the 1909 science block was demolished and a new science block, the James Clerk Maxwell Centre, named in honour of the 19th century scientist and former pupil, was opened on 3 November 2006 by Lord Falconer of Thoroton.

 Abuse

In 2020 and 2021 six men accused a man who had taught at Fettes College and Edinburgh Academy of physical and sexual abuse at the schools when they were pupils in the 1970s. The Scottish Crown Prosecution Service was initially reluctant to prosecute the alleged abuser because of difficulties in seeking his extradition from South Africa—he had moved there—and his advanced age, but South Africa approved the UK's extradition request, on six charges of lewd, indecent and libidinous practices and behaviour and one of indecent assault, in 2020. Edinburgh Academy apologised to anyone who suffered abuse and said in 2022 that it now had robust safeguarding measures in place. The perpetrator admitted the abuse, and was fighting extradition from South Africa to the UK in 2022.

On 27 July 2022, broadcaster Nicky Campbell disclosed that he had witnessed and experienced sexual and violent physical abuse while a pupil at the Edinburgh Academy in the 1970s. Alex Renton, a journalist investigating child abuse in private schools, reported that ex-pupils of Edinburgh Academy had named 17 other staff members, employed between the 1950s and 1980s, as physical and sexual abusers.

Notable alumni

Former pupils of The Edinburgh Academy are known as Academicals, or Accies, a name shared with the associated rugby club.

Famous alumni of the school include Robert Louis Stevenson, James Clerk Maxwell, Nicky Campbell, Magnus Magnusson, Baron Falconer of Thoroton and Mike Blair. It has also produced one Nobel Prize winner (J. Michael Kosterlitz), numerous political and legal figures, several rugby internationals and nine recipients of the Victoria Cross; the highest number of any school in Scotland. According to the Sutton Trust, the school is placed second in Scotland and joint 36th in the UK for the number of the nation's leading people produced.

Rectors
Rectors of The Edinburgh Academy since it was founded in 1824:
 1824-28: John Williams
 1828-29: Thomas Sheepshanks
 1829-47: John Williams, again
 1847-54: John Hannah
 1854-69: James Stephen Hodson
 1869-88: Thomas Harvey
 1888-1901: Robert Mackenzie
 1901-10: Reginald Carter
 1910-26: Robert Ferard
 1926-31: Hugh Lyon
 1931-45: Lionel Smith
 1945-51: Clarence Seaman
 1951-62: Robert Watt
 1962-77: Herbert Mills
 1977-92: Laurence Ellis
 1992-95: John Rees
 1995-2008: John Light
 2008-2017: Marco Longmore
 Since 2017: Barry Welsh

Other notable staff
 D'Arcy Wentworth Thompson, classicist, taught at the school from 1852 to 1863, father of biologist also named D'Arcy Wentworth Thompson
 Jack Mendl, taught at the school from 1950 to 1977, also played cricket at first-class level
 Arthur Pressland FRSE (1865–1934), educational theorist, linguist, schoolmaster and writer
 W. P. D. Wightman FRSE Science Master from 1923 to 1951

See also
 List of schools in Edinburgh
 List of independent schools in Scotland

References

 Magnus Magnusson (1974), The Clacken and the Slate, Collins, London. 
 Edinburgh Academical Club (1995), List of Past and Present Pupils 1824-1995, Edinburgh Academical Club
 Stirling, Bill (1999), 175 Accies'', Edinburgh Academical Club

External links
 
 The School website
 Edinburgh Academy's page on Scottish Schools Online

School buildings completed in 1824
Category A listed buildings in Edinburgh
Private schools in Edinburgh
Organisations based in Edinburgh with royal patronage
Member schools of the Headmasters' and Headmistresses' Conference
Educational institutions established in 1824